Ta Khmau is the capital and largest city of Kandal province in central Cambodia.
The city is about 11 km (7 mi) south of Phnom Penh (directly borders Phnom Penh).

Approximately 60% of the people of Ta Khmau travel to work in Phnom Penh.

Administrative divisions 
Ta Khmau is divided into 10 communes.
 Sangkat Kampong Samnanh (សង្កាត់កំពង់សំណាញ់)
 Sangkat Prek Hor (សង្កាត់ព្រែកហូរ)
 Sangkat Takdol (សង្កាត់តាក្តុល)
 Sangkat Ta Khmau (សង្កាត់តាខ្មៅ)
 Sangkat Daeum Mien (សង្កាត់ដើមមៀន)
 Sangkat Prek Russey (សង្កាត់ព្រែកឫស្សី)
 Sangkat Svay Rolum (សង្កាត់ស្វាយរលំ)
 Sangkat Kaoh Anlong Chen (សង្កាត់កោះអន្លង់ចិន)
 Sangkat Setbou (សង្កាត់សិត្បូ)
 Sangkat Roka Khpos (សង្កាត់រកាខ្ពស់)

Education
Below are list of some institutions in Ta Khmau.
 
Stueng Chrau Lower Secondary School
Hun Sen Ta Khmau High School
Ta Khmau Primary School
Hun Sen Sereypheap High School
Bun Rany Hun Sen Kroa Peur Ha Primary School
Bun Rany Hun Sen Prek Samraong Primary School
Hun Sen Regional Pedagogy Center, Kandal Province

Health Centers 
Victory Hospital (មន្ទីរពេទ្យជ័យជំនះ)

Religious Temples 
Wat Krabao
Wat Krapeu Ha
Wat Puth Yetndy
Wat Prek Samraong
Wat Prek Ho

Market 
 Market corner of the factory
 Dulux Market Takhmao
 Takhmao Market
 New Takhmao market
 Prekhor Market

References

External links
Kandal at Royal Government of Cambodia website
Kandal at Ministry of Commerce website

Cities in Cambodia
Populated places in Kandal province
Provincial capitals in Cambodia